A by-election was held for the New South Wales Legislative Assembly electorate of Wentworth on 28 September 1887 because of the resignation of William MacGregor.

Dates

Result

William MacGregor resigned.

See also
Electoral results for the district of Wentworth
List of New South Wales state by-elections

References

1887 elections in Australia
New South Wales state by-elections
1880s in New South Wales